Walter Libuda (24 June 1950 – 6 July 2021) was a German painter and plastic artist.

Biography
From 1968 to 1971, Libuda painted sets at the Landestheater Altenburg. From 1973 to 1978, he studied at the Hochschule für Grafik und Buchkunst Leipzig. In the two years following, he was an apprentice of Bernhard Heisig. He returned to school in Leipzig and served as an assistant professor from 1979 to 1985. He then moved to Berlin. In addition to sculptures and paintings, he made ceramics and bronze works.

Walter Libuda died in Berlin on 6 July 2021 at the age of 71.

References

1950 births
2021 deaths
German male painters
German male artists
People from Altenburger Land